Asia was a merchant barque built at Whitby in 1813. She made one voyage to India for the British East India Company (EIC) in 1820–21, and one voyage to Van Diemen's Land in 1827–28. Asia then traded to the Mediterranean, but mostly to Quebec. She was last listed in 1850.

Mention is made of the ship in “Reminiscences of a Canadian Pioneer” by Samuel Thompson 
  “...at length engaged passage in the bark Asia, 500 tons, rated A. No. 1, formerly an East Indiaman, and now bound for Quebec, to seek a cargo of white pine lumber for the London market.”

Origins
Asia was launched at Whitby in 1813. She then became a transport.

Asia first appeared in Lloyd's Register (LR) in 1813 with Walker, master, Chapman, owner, and trade London transport.

Lloyd's Register for the years 1820 to 1823 does not show a voyage to India. However, the Register was only as accurate as the information owners chose to feed it. The Register of Shipping for 1821 does show a voyage to India. It has Asia, Patterson, master, Chapman, owner, sailing from London to Bombay, and then London to Quebec.

EIC voyage (1820–1821): Captain John Patterson sailed from the Downs on 4 June 1820, bound for Bombay. Asia arrived at Bombay on 26 September. Homeward bound, she was at the Cape of Good Hope on 27 February 1821, reached Saint Helena on 19 March, and arrived back at East India Dock on 31 May.

In 1825 Asia shifted her registry to London.

Convict transport: A table of convict voyages to New South Wales and Van Diemen's Land in 1828 Lloyd's Register, lists Asia, J. Edman, master, A. Chapman, owner, but does not specify the destination. A belated notation in Lloyd's Register for 1829 too advises that J. Edman was master of Asia in 1827.

Under the command of John Edman, Asia sailed from London, England on 1 August 1827, and arrived at Hobart Town on 30 November. She had embarked 158 male convicts, one of whom died on the voyage. Asia left Hobart Town on 19 December bound for Sydney arriving on 24 December. Asia left Sydney on 25 January bound for Isle de France.

Later career

Citations and references
Citations

References
 
 
  

1813 ships
Convict ships to Tasmania
Ships built in Whitby
Ships of the British East India Company
Age of Sail merchant ships
Merchant ships of the United Kingdom